Methimepip is a histamine agonist which is highly selective for the H3 subtype. It is the N-methyl derivative of immepip.

References

Imidazoles
Histamine agonists
Piperidines